Shila Amzah is the fifth studio album by Malaysian singer-songwriter Shila Amzah. It was released on December 10, 2013, through Shila Amzah Entertainment Berhad and distributed by Warner Music Malaysia. Shila began preparing for the album after winning Asian Wave, and during a significant amount of media scrutiny. Over the course of the short songwriting period, she primarily collaborated with Malaysia's most popular producer Helen Yap and Aubrey Suwito.

Background 
Before she released the album, she held a preview of the album at Red Box Plus, Pavilion, Kuala Lumpur on July 5, 2013. A further showcase of the album was held at Penthouse, The Icon, Kuala Lumpur on October 16, 2013. Shila Amzahs record producer was herself, ND Lala, Helen Yap, Tan Boon Huat and the sound engineer for this album was Aubrey Suwito, Zairi Ariffin, Yusalman Azua, Hadie Pranoto, Amir Sulaiman and Greg Henderson. The album was released on iTunes on December 10, 2013. In December 2013, Shila Amzah released her official music video of "Masih Aku Cinta". This music video was based on her love story when she broke up with Sharnaaz Ahmad, a Malaysian actor after a controversy involving Sharnaaz Ahmad with Shila's father.

 Credits and personnel 
As listed in the liner notes.Recording and management Recorded and mixed at NAR Records (Kuala Lumpur, Malaysia)
 Mastered at Sterling Sound (New York City, United States of America)
 Shila Amzah Entertainment Berhad and Shanghai Media Group RecordsPersonnel'
 Wan Izhar – photographer
 Shila Amzah – wardrobe stylist, lead vocals, executive producer, vocal harmony, songwriter, composer
 Yanna Husin – hijab stylist, wardrobe stylist
 Rosman Nizar – booklet design, cover art, graphic design
 Fiza Zainuddin – make-up artist
 ND Lala – executive producer
 Helen Yap – producer
 Tan Boon Hat – producer
 Hadie Pranoto – engineer
 Yusalman Azua – engineer
 Zairi Ariffin – engineer
 Aubrey Suwito – engineer
 Greg Henderson – engineer
 Amir Sulaiman – engineer, mixing
 Tom Coyne – mastering

Awards and nominations

Track listing

References

2013 albums
Shila Amzah albums
Albums produced by Shila Amzah
Malay-language albums
Mandopop albums
Mandarin-language albums